Muta is a surname. Notable people with the surname include:

Barbara Muta (born 1982), Papua New Guinean footballer
Cyril Muta (born 1987), Papua New Guinean footballer
David Muta (born 1987), Papua New Guinean footballer
, Japanese footballer

Japanese-language surnames